Archidendron muellerianum, the veiny lace flower or small-flower laceflower, is a rainforest tree with a restricted range in eastern Australia. It is a rare plant, with a ROTAP rating of 3RCa.

The tree was first described as Albizia muelleriana in 1896 by Joseph Maiden and Richard Thomas Baker, before being moved to its current binomial name by Nielsen. The specific epithet muelleriana honours the name of one of Australia's outstanding colonial botanists, Ferdinand von Mueller.

The leaflets have prominent veins on both upper and undersurfaces. Orange on the inside, they bear shiny black seeds.

It grows north from Alstonville, New South Wales up to some of the remnant natural areas in the Gold Coast in south-eastern Queensland, in coastal or subtropical rainforest. The former habitat of seaside and sub tropical rainforest was mostly destroyed for agriculture and housing.

References

muellerianum
Flora of New South Wales
Flora of Queensland
Trees of Australia